Geographical Names Board may refer to:

 Geographic names board, an official body established by a government to decide on official names for geographical areas and features
 Geographical Names Board of Canada
 Geographical Names Board of New South Wales

See also